Saint-Louis is a municipality in southwestern Quebec, Canada in the Regional County Municipality of Les Maskoutains. The population as of the Canada 2011 Census was 775.

Demographics

Population

Language

See also
List of municipalities in Quebec

References

Incorporated places in Les Maskoutains Regional County Municipality
Municipalities in Quebec
Canada geography articles needing translation from French Wikipedia